The Electoral (Amendment) Act 1961 (No. 19) was a law in Ireland which revised Dáil constituencies. The new constituencies were first used at the 1961 general election to the 17th Dáil held on 4 October 1961.

This Act replaced the Electoral (Amendment) Act 1947, which had defined constituencies since the 1948 general election.

The Electoral (Amendment) Act 1959 had been struck out in 1961 by the High Court as being repugnant to the Constitution of Ireland because of excessive malapportionment and never came into effect. The Electoral (Amendment) Act 1961 relied instead on manipulating district size. Where Fianna Fáil had less than 50% support, four-seat constituencies were used, so that Fianna Fáil would win two of four seats; where it had more than 50% support, three- or five-seat constituencies would give it two of three, or three of five. It also reduced the number of seats in the Dáil by 3 from 147 to 144.

Before signing the bill, president Éamon de Valera convened a meeting of the Council of State on 14 July to consider the legislation. He then referred it to the Supreme Court to consider its constitutionality under Article 26 of the Constitution of Ireland. It held that the legislation was not repugnant to the constitution, and the president signed the legislation.

It was repealed by the Electoral (Amendment) Act 1969, which created a new schedule of constituencies first used at the 1969 general election to the 19th Dáil.

Constituencies

See also
Elections in the Republic of Ireland

References

Electoral 1961
1961 in Irish law
Acts of the Oireachtas of the 1960s